Dragan Živkov (born 3 November 1958) is a former politician in Serbia. He served in the National Assembly of Serbia from 2004 to 2012 as a member of the far-right Serbian Radical Party.

Private career
Živkov is a private entrepreneur from Bečej in the province of Vojvodina. In 2005, he indicated that he ran a family-owned company dealing with services and transport in civil engineering. He is also the president of FK Vojvodina Bačko Gradište.

Politician
Živkov first sought election to the national assembly in the 1997 Serbian parliamentary election, appearing in the seventh position on the Radical Party's electoral list for the Zrenjanin division. The list won four seats, and he did not receive a mandate. (From 1992 to 2000, one-third of Serbian parliamentary mandates were awarded to candidates on successful lists in numerical order, while the other two-thirds were distributed among other candidates at the discretion of the sponsoring parties or coalitions. Živkov could have received a mandate when the assembly convened despite his relatively low list position, although in the event he did not.)

He later appeared in the second position on the Radical Party's list for the Vrbas division in the 2000 election for the Chamber of Citizens in the Federal Assembly of Yugoslavia. The list did not win any mandates. He was, however, elected to the Bečej municipal assembly in the concurrent 2000 Serbian local elections, winning in the second division in Bačko Gradište. This was the last local electoral cycle in Serbia wherein members were elected in single-member constituencies; all subsequent local electoral cycles have been held under proportional representation.

Serbia's electoral system was reformed at the republic level in 2000, such that the entire country became a single electoral division and all mandates were awarded to candidates on successful lists at the discretion of the sponsoring parties or coalitions, irrespective of numerical order. Živkov appeared in the sixty-first position on the Radical Party's list in the 2003 Serbian parliamentary election. The list won eighty-two mandates, and he was included in the party's delegation when the assembly met in January 2004. Although the Radicals won more seats than any other party in 2003, they fell well short of a majority and served in opposition in the parliament that followed. Živkov was a member of the committee on inter-ethnic relations and the committee on economic reforms.

Žikvov was the Radical Party's candidate for mayor of Bečej in the 2004 Serbian local elections and finished third. He also led the party's list in the concurrent municipal assembly election and was re-elected when the list won seven mandates. The Radicals initially participated in a local coalition government after the election, and Žikvov was a member of the municipal council (i.e., the executive branch of the local government) from 14 October 2004 until 16 April 2005, when the party was excluded from the administration. Bečej's sitting mayor lost a recall election in late 2005, and Živkov ran in the 2006 by-election to fill the position. He was defeated in the second round of voting. Serbia subsequently abandoned the direct election of mayors.

Živkov appeared on the Radical Party's lists in the 2007 and 2008 parliamentary elections and was included in the party's assembly delegation both times. He was also re-elected to the Bečej assembly in the 2008 local elections, after leading a combined list of the Radicals, the Democratic Party of Serbia, and New Serbia. The Radical Party continued to serve in opposition in this time, at both the republic level and the municipal level in Bečej. The party also experienced a serious split in late 2008, with several members joining the more moderate Serbian Progressive Party under the leadership of Tomislav Nikolić and Aleksandar Vučić. Živkov remained with the Radicals.

Serbia's electoral system was reformed yet again in 2011, such that mandates were awarded in numerical order to candidates on successful lists. Živkov appeared in the sixty-fifth position on the Radical Party's list in the 2012 parliamentary election and led the party's list in Bečej in the concurrent 2012 local elections. Both lists failed to cross their respective electoral thresholds.

Živkov also sought election to the Assembly of Vojvodina on two occasions, running for the Bečej constituency seat in the 2004 and 2012 provincial elections. He was defeated both times. He has not sought a return to political life since 2012.

Electoral record

Provincial (Vojvodina)

Municipal (Bečej)

References

1958 births
Living people
People from Bečej
Members of the National Assembly (Serbia)
Serbian Radical Party politicians